Dacey is a surname. Notable people with the surname include:

Amy Dacey, American politician
Austin Dacey (born 1972), American philosopher, writer and activist
Gavin Dacey (born 1984), Welsh rugby union player
John Dacey (1854–1912), Australian politician
Kristian Dacey (born 1989), Welsh rugby union player
Malcolm Dacey (born 1960), Welsh rugby union player
Mark Dacey (born 1966), Canadian curler
Sebastian Dacey (born 1982), German artist